Jefferson Alves Oliveira (born 25 February 1990) is a Brazilian professional footballer who plays as a centre-back, most recently for FC Noah.

Biography

Udinese
Jefferson Oliveira was a youth product of Italian club Udinese in Serie A. In the first half of 2010–11 season he was an overage player of Primavera under-20 team. He left for Salernitana along with Fabinho in January 2011. In 2011 Jefferson was signed by Serie B club Modena.

In July 2012 he left for Perugia along with Fabinho.

On 24 January 2013 he left for Venezia.

Vicenza
On 31 August 2013 Jefferson Oliveira was signed by the third division club Vicenza in a co-ownership deal, for €5,000. He immediately left fourth division club Bellaria in a temporary deal. In June 2014 Udinese gave up the remain 50% registration rights to Vicenza for free.

He wore number 28 for Vicenza in the 2014–15 season. However, he left for Juve Stabia in a temporary deal in September 2014.

Atletico CP
On 11 August 2015 Jefferson Oliveira was signed by club Atlético CP on a free transfer.

Noah
On 3 February 2021, Jefferson Oliveira signed for Noah. On 16 December 2021, Jefferson left Noah after his contract wasn't extended.

References

External links
 
 Football.it 
 Profile at Pedrinho VRP (football agent) 

1990 births
Footballers from São Paulo
Living people
Brazilian footballers
Association football central defenders
Brazilian expatriate footballers
Brazilian expatriate sportspeople in Italy
Expatriate footballers in Italy
Udinese Calcio players
U.S. Salernitana 1919 players
Modena F.C. players
A.C. Perugia Calcio players
Venezia F.C. players
L.R. Vicenza players
A.C. Bellaria Igea Marina players
S.S. Juve Stabia players
Atlético Clube de Portugal players
Gil Vicente F.C. players
F.C. Famalicão players
C.D. Fátima players
Serie B players
Serie C players
Liga Portugal 2 players
Campeonato de Portugal (league) players
Expatriate footballers in Portugal